NGC 3972 is a spiral galaxy located in the northern constellation of Ursa Major. It was discovered by William Herschel on April 14, 1789. It is a member of the NGC 3992 Group of galaxies.

Type Ia supernova SN 2011by was discovered in this galaxy on April 26, 2011 by Zhangwei Jin and Xing Gao in China.

Gallery

References

External links

NGC 3972 on SIMBAD

3972
Ursa Major (constellation)
Unbarred spiral galaxies
037466